Lubomír Ledl (23 July 1952 – 20 May 2021) was a Czech politician who served as a member of the Federal Assembly of Czechoslovakia.

References

1952 births
2021 deaths
Czech politicians
Members of the Chamber of the Nations of Czechoslovakia (1990–1992)
Communist Party of Czechoslovakia politicians
Communist Party of Bohemia and Moravia politicians
Charles University alumni
People from Zlín